A kitten heel is a short stiletto heel, with a slight curve setting the heel in from the back edge of the shoe. The style was popularized by Audrey Hepburn, and recent followers of the fashion include Theresa May, Michelle Obama, Mistress Isabelle Brooks, and Hillary Clinton.

Shoes with kitten heels may be worn at work in an office setting by people who wish to wear feminine attire that is still practical. For parties, kitten heels are an alternative for those who find high heels uncomfortable.

Definition
Kitten heels are shoes with a tapered heel of approximately 2.5 to 5 centimeters (1–2 in) in height. They are on the shorter end of stiletto shoes, which can have heels as tall as 12.5 centimeters (5 in).

History
Kitten heels were introduced in the late 1950s as formal fashion attire for young adolescent girls, as higher heels would have been considered unseemly for girls as young as thirteen because of, for instance, unease of walk. They were sometimes referred to as "trainer heels" in the US, indicating their use in getting young girls used to wearing high heels. However, by the early 1960s, they became fashionable for older teenagers and eventually for women of all ages. The demise of the stiletto heel in the late 1960s meant that women could choose between a wider variety of intermediate length heels, which decreased the appeal of the kitten heel. However, the kitten heel reemerged in the 1980s along with wedge heels, and have become once again fashionable since 2003, but are not made in abundance due to the preference for stiletto heels by women during this time period.

References

External links
 Shoes vocabulary

 

Shoes
High-heeled footwear